This is a list of settlements located on the coastline of Lake Ohrid which is located between the countries of North Macedonia and Albania. Settlements are automatically listed from east of the River Drin outflow from the Lake, clockwise. The table can be reorganised based on country, municipality name, population, and the language(s) spoken in the settlement. Major settlements (population of 1000 or greater) are highlighted in bold.

Albanian Ohrid Lake Coast
Populated places in Albania
Populated places in North Macedonia
Ohrid